The Matador (Portland, Oregon) may refer to:

 The Matador (bar)
 The Matador (restaurant)